DYA may refer to:

 Daytona Beach Thruway Motorcoach stop (Amtrak code: DYA), a Daytona Beach, Florida Amtrak station
 Demopolis Municipal Airport (FAA location identifier: DYA), a city-owned public-use airport
 DYA framework, an enterprise architecture framework developed by the consulting company Sogeti
 Dysart Airport (IATA code: DYA), an airport near Dysart, Queensland